

168001–168100 

|-bgcolor=#f2f2f2
| colspan=4 align=center | 
|}

168101–168200 

|-id=126
| 168126 Chengbruce || 2006 GK || Bruce C. H. Cheng (born 1936), Taiwanese ecological entrepreneur, chairman and CEO of Delta Electronics, Inc. || 
|}

168201–168300 

|-id=221
| 168221 Donjennings ||  || Don E. Jennings (born 1948) of the NASA Goddard Spaceflight Center, served as a Co-Investigator for Surface Composition Science for the New Horizons mission to Pluto. || 
|-id=234
| 168234 Hsi Ching ||  || Hsi Ching, or the Western Capital, is a term often used in Chinese history. It may refer to Haoking (10th century BCE to 7th century BCE), Ch'ang-an (2nd century BCE to 7th century CE), or Ta-t'ung (11th to 12th century CE). || 
|-id=261
| 168261 Puglia ||  || Apulia (in Italian Puglia), a region at the south-eastern end of the Italian peninsula || 
|}

168301–168400 

|-id=321
| 168321 Josephschmidt ||  || Joseph Schmidt (1904–1942), an operatic tenor who performed in the world's top concert halls || 
|-id=358
| 168358 Casca ||  || "Casca", the Canadian Astronomical Society || 
|}

168401–168500 

|-bgcolor=#f2f2f2
| colspan=4 align=center | 
|}

168501–168600 

|-id=531
| 168531 Joshuakammer ||  || Joshua A. Kammer (born 1986) is a research scientist at the Southwest Research Institute, who served as a postdoctoral science team member for the atmospheric investigation for the New Horizons mission to Pluto. || 
|}

168601–168700 

|-id=635
| 168635 Davidkaufmann ||  || David E. Kaufmann (born 1964), a principal analyst at the Southwest Research Institute, served as a PEPSSI Instrument Sequencer for the New Horizons mission to Pluto. || 
|-id=638
| 168638 Waltersiegmund ||  || Walter Siegmund (born 1950) is an American engineer, the Project Engineer for the Sloan Digital Sky Survey, and a designer of the telescope and its optical fiber positioning system || 
|-id=698
| 168698 Robpickman ||  || Robert D. Pickman (born 1945), was an engineer for IBM and also for NASA developing ground-based systems to support the space shuttle || 
|}

168701–168800 

|-id=767
| 168767 Kochte ||  || Mark C. Kochte (born 1962) of the Johns Hopkins University Applied Physics Laboratory, served as a mission operations analyst in support of the SWAP instrument command sequences for the New Horizons mission to Pluto. || 
|}

168801–168900 

|-bgcolor=#f2f2f2
| colspan=4 align=center | 
|}

168901–169000 

|-id=948
| 168948 Silvestri ||  || Nicole Silvestri (born 1973) is an American astronomer with the Sloan Digital Sky Survey, known for establishing a chromospheric activity-age relation for M dwarf stars and work on SDSS close binary systems || 
|}

References 

168001-169000